Ciuacoatl Mons is a mountain on Venus.  Its name is derived from the Aztec fertility goddess.

Mountains on Venus
sv:Ciuacoatl Mons